Torrance Coombs (born June 14, 1983) is a Canadian-American actor. He is perhaps best known for his roles as Thomas Culpepper in The Tudors (2007–2010) and as Sebastian "Bash" de Poitiers, the illegitimate son of King Henry II of France and his chief mistress Diane de Poitiers in Reign (2013–2017) and Declan in The Originals.

Early life and education
Coombs was born and raised in Vancouver, British Columbia, Canada. He joined the school choir to better express himself and was soon cast in the role of Rum Tum Tugger in the musical play Cats. He rented a video of Elvis Presley in concert to help prepare for the role. Coombs holds a dual citizenship to both Canada and the United States.

He continued to do theatre roles throughout high school at University Hill Secondary School and eventually enrolled in the acting program at the University of British Columbia in Vancouver.

Career

Theatre
Coombs has appeared in productions at Bard on the Beach, an annual professional Shakespeare festival held in Vancouver; he has also appeared in the musical A Little Night Music.

Television
His first starring role on television was as John Doe in the 2008 CBC comedy series jPod, based on the novel of the same name by Douglas Coupland. Coombs also appeared as Lance Corporal C. Sellers in a 2009 episode of the television series Battlestar Galactica.

In 2010, Coombs appeared in a recurring role as Thomas Culpeper in the television series The Tudors, and in CBC's Heartland as Chase Powers. In 2011, he co-starred as Sam Besht as in the Hulu drama series Endgame.

On March 11, 2013, it was announced that Coombs had been cast in a lead role as Sebastian in the CW period drama series Reign. He was nominated for Outstanding Actor in a Drama TV Series at the 2014 Monte-Carlo Television Festival for his role in Reign. In early 2016, Coombs chose to depart from Reign as a series regular at the end of the third season, with the possibility to return as a guest star in future episodes.

In March 2016, it was announced that Coombs would star as a series regular for Shonda Rimes' new series Still Star-Crossed on ABC.

In August 2017, it was announced that Coombs would star in a recurring role in the final season of The Originals.

Film
In 2009 he starred as Sam Matheson in the short film The Familiar, and appeared as PJ in the short film Good Image Media. In 2012, he starred in the psychological thriller Liars All.

Personal life
Coombs began dating Miss USA 2011 Alyssa Campanella in 2010. On June 12, 2015 it was announced that they were engaged. On 2 April 2016, the couple got married in Santa Ynez, California. In April 2019, the couple announced their separation and got divorced that same year. Since 2020, he has been in a relationship with actress Sloane Avery.

Filmography

References

External links
 
 

1983 births
21st-century Canadian male actors
Canadian male film actors
Canadian male Shakespearean actors
Canadian male stage actors
Canadian male television actors
Living people
Male actors from Vancouver
University of British Columbia alumni